Óscar Adán Bóveda Rojas (born 16 January 1989) is a Paraguayan former professional footballer who played as a forward.

References
 
 

1989 births
Living people
Paraguayan footballers
Association football forwards
General Caballero Sport Club footballers
Independiente F.B.C. footballers
12 de Octubre Football Club players
Club Atlético 3 de Febrero players
Magallanes footballers
Primera B de Chile players
Paraguayan expatriate footballers
Paraguayan expatriate sportspeople in Chile
Expatriate footballers in Chile